Lee Rose (Australia) was a rugby league footballer in the New South Wales Rugby League (NSWRL) – The major rugby league competition in Australia.
 
Rose played in the seasons 1946–48, the centre made 28 appearances for his club side Eastern Suburbs. In the 1947 season Rose was Eastern Suburbs leading try soccer.

His only representative appearance was for Sydney in 1947.

Sources
 Whiticker, Alan & Hudson, Glen (2006) The Encyclopedia of Rugby League Players, Gavin Allen Publishing, Sydney

References

Australian rugby league players
Sydney Roosters players
Living people
Year of birth missing (living people)
Place of birth missing (living people)